Sulca is a hispanized Quechua surname common in Peru. The surname means "little brother".

Débora Sulca (born 1986), Peruvian model
Nélida Sulca (born 1987), Peruvian athlete
Wendy Sulca (born 1996), Peruvian singer